Riccardo Dario Scamarcio (born 13 November 1979) is an Italian actor and film producer.

Life and career
Scamarcio was born in Trani, Apulia, the son of Irene Petrafesa, a painter, and Emilio Scamarcio.

He went to train as an actor at the Scuola Nazionale di Cinema in Rome, where he now lives. His debut acting role was in a TV series in 2000, while his first ever lead role in a feature film was in Three Steps Over Heaven (2004), directed by Luca Lucini. Through this he immediately became well known to the Italian speaking public, especially a young audience. His success brought him prominence as a sex symbol and boosted requests for his acting skills, leading to his role in Texas (2005), directed by Fausto Paravidino and soon to him joining the cast of Romanzo Criminale, playing a monosyllabic, enigmatic thug character in a powerful portrait of a mafiosi community directed by Michele Placido.

In 2006 he acted in The Black Arrow, a TV series broadcast by Canale 5, adapted from the novel by Robert Louis Stevenson, and took on four new film roles: My Brother Is an Only Child (2007), directed by Daniele Luchetti, based on the novel Il fasciocomunista by Antonio Pennacchi. Scamarcio won a David di Donatello nomination for Best Supporting Actor for this work. He also played in Manual of Love 2 (2007), directed by Giovanni Veronesi, Ho voglia di te (2007), directed by Luis Prieto, and Go Go Tales (2007), directed by Abel Ferrara.

In 2007 he began work on At a Glance (2008) directed by Sergio Rubini, Italians (2009), a comedy directed by Giovanni Veronesi, and The Big Dream (2009), set in Italy in 1968, directed by Michele Placido. Eden à l'Ouest, directed by Costa-Gavras, saw Scamarcio playing an illegal immigrant-cum-innocent abroad. The Cézanne Affair (2009), directed by Sergio Rubini, co-starred Scamarcio's partner, Italian-Greek actress Valeria Golino, who plays his sister.

He also starred in John Wick: Chapter 2, playing the Italian Mob boss Santino D'Antonio, the antagonist in the film.

Filmography

Film

Television
 Ama il tuo nemico 2 (2000)
 Io ti salverò (2001)
 Compagni di scuola (2001)
 La freccia nera (2006)
 Il segreto dell'acqua(palermo connection) (2011)
 London Spy (2015)
 Master of None (2017)
 The Woman in White (2018)

Music video
 Drammaturgia (Le Vibrazioni) (2008)
 Insolita (Le Vibrazioni) (2008)
 Meraviglioso (Negramaro) (2008)
 Ti scatterò una foto (Tiziano Ferro) (2007)

Theatre
 Non essere - Mise en espace di Leonardo Petrillo (2003)
 I tre moschettieri (2004)
 Romeo e Giulietta (2011)

References

External links 

Riccardo Scamarcio Fanlisting

1979 births
Living people
People from Trani
Italian male film actors
Italian male stage actors
Italian male television actors
21st-century Italian male actors
Nastro d'Argento winners